Purba Paschim is a Bengali theatre group of Kolkata, West Bengal, India. The group was founded in 2005 and has staged several plays like Babli, Ashalin etc. The famous productions of the group are "Patalbabu Filmstar" based on Satyajit Roy's story and " Antony Soudamini" Directed By Soumitra Mitra, Tagores Play Chaturanga Directed By Bratya Basu acted by Kushal Chakraborty, Chaity Ghoshal, Debdut Ghosh, Soumitra Mitra. Notable people like Biswajit Chakraborty, Gargi roychoudhry, Shaantilal Mukherjee, Chaity Ghosal, Debdut Ghosh, Kanchana Moitro, Subhrajeet Dutta, Kushal Chakraborty, Film Actor Rahul acted in this Group. In the Festivals of this Group We have seen, Amman Ali Khan, Ayaan Ali Khan, Sharmila Tagore, Soumitra Chatterjee, Mohan Aghase, Gulzar, Shabana Azmi, Amol Palekar, Nandita Das and Many Others.

History 

Purba Paschim was launched in the year 2005. The first play they staged was Babli directed by Bratya Basu. Soumitra Mitra is the Director of the Group. The group organizes a theatre workshop every year. Many Directors have worked in various productions of the group like Bibash Chakraborty, Arun Mukhopadhayay, Ramaprasad Banik, Debesh Chattopadhyay,Goutam Halder,etc.

Productions 
(in alphabetical order)
 Ashalin
 Akkel Gurum
 Antony Soudamini
 Babli (2005)
 Chaturanga
 Bhalomanush
 Hasuli Banker Upokotha (2015)
 Patalbabu Filmstar
 Raktakarabi
 Ek Mancha Ek Jibon

References

External links 
 

Theatre companies in India
Bengali theatre groups